The 2016 Honda Indy 200 was the 12th round of the 2016 IndyCar Series. The event took place July 29–31, 2016 and was held at the Mid-Ohio Sports Car Course in Lexington, Ohio. It was the 10th time the course had been used since returning to the IndyCar Series schedule in 2007.

Qualifying took place on July 30, 2016 with the threat of rain throughout the session. Despite dealing with lower back pain from the morning's practice session, Simon Pagenaud grabbed pole position for the event, setting a new track record with a time of 1:03.8700. It was Pagenaud's sixth pole position on the season. Pagenaud teammate and championship rival Will Power qualified second, while Josef Newgarden qualified third. Defending race winner Graham Rahal managed a sixth place qualifying run. Scott Dixon, who had been the fastest car until qualifying, missed out on the Fast Six qualifying session after not changing tires fast enough to be able to make another qualifying run in the second round. He started in 11th as a result.

The race was run with far better weather conditions than the previous day's sessions. At the start, Simon Pagenaud held his lead over Will Power with Josef Newgarden slotting into third. The field managed to get through the first corners without major incident, though a few drivers touched wheels. Early in the race, several teams began to attempt alternate strategies to improve their positions, including Mikhail Aleshin, Conor Daly, and Scott Dixon. Dixon's move would not matter, however, as on lap 16, he attempted to make a pass on Hélio Castroneves in turn three. The two touched, causing severe suspension damage to Dixon's car and relegating him to a last place finish. Castroneves continued on, but came in later after damage to his rear wing was too much to be able to keep the car on track. This resulted in the race's first caution period, during which many of those who had not yet made their first pit stops, including Pagenaud and Power, came in. Juan Pablo Montoya and Marco Andretti elected to stay out during this sequence, promoting them to first and second respectively.

Racing resumed on lap 19, where Josef Newgarden was able to get around Will Power on track. The next lap however, Power attempted to pass him back, but in the process clipped the rear bumper pod on Newgarden's car, forcing Newgarden to pit for a rear wing assembly change for the second consecutive race. Up front, Montoya continued to lead until lap 25, when he finally made his first pit stop. The lead was handed to one of the drivers on the alternate pit stop strategy, Mikhail Aleshin, who began to pull away from the field. Aleshin maintained his lead through the second pit stop sequence, but behind him, the Team Penske duo of Power and Pagenaud moved into second and third thanks to quick pit work from their teams. The gap to Aleshin, though, remained large.

On lap 61, the second caution of the race occurred when Jack Hawksworth went wide on entry to turn one, causing him to lose control and hit the wall. The caution allowed for the final round of pit stops of the race. During the stops, race leader Aleshin was released directly into the path of Josef Newgarden, causing the two to make contact and damaging both cars. The event ruined Aleshin's day, dropping him down the order to 17th. Will Power emerged from pit lane first, with Simon Pagenaud behind him. The race lead was handed to Conor Daly, who elected to stay out during the caution, but did not have enough fuel to the finish if another caution period did not occur.

Racing resumed on lap 66, where Daly immediately pulled out in front. Behind him, though, Pagenaud began to put heavy pressure on Power and in turn 12 was able to get by. This would prove to be the winning move of the race, as no caution period came, forcing Daly to pit on lap 84. One more incident did occur, though, on lap 87, when Sébastien Bourdais braked too late into turn 4, causing him to collide with Takuma Sato and send both of course. Sato was able to continue, while Bourdais' race ended with his car stuck in a gravel trap. Up front, Simon Pagenaud was able to pull away and win by 4.1620 seconds over his teammate Will Power. It was Pagenaud's fourth win of the season, but his first since prior to the Indianapolis 500. The victory also allowed Pagenaud to extend his lead in the points over his teammate. The podium was completed by Carlos Muñoz, who had a quiet but very strong day to finish as the top Honda in the field. Conor Daly's strong run at the end allowed him a sixth place finish, making him the highest placed rookie in the field. Mikhail Aleshin, the driver with the most laps led on the day, was not able to recover from his pit lane incident and finished a lowly 17th.

Report

Qualifying

Source for individual rounds:

Race Results

Notes
 Points include 1 point for leading at least 1 lap during a race, an additional 2 points for leading the most race laps, and 1 point for Pole Position.

Source for time gaps:

Championship standings after the race

Drivers' Championship standings

 Note: Only the top five positions are included.

References

External links
 Official Pit Stop Data
 Official Race Broadcast

Honda Indy 200
2016 Honda Indy 200
Honda Indy 200
Indy 200 at Mid-Ohio